Where the Rivers Flow North is a 1993 American drama film directed by Jay Craven and starring Rip Torn, Tantoo Cardinal, Treat Williams and Michael J. Fox.  It is based on Howard Frank Mosher's novel of the same name.

Cast
Rip Torn as Noel Lord
Tantoo Cardinal as Bangor
Bill Raymond as Ray Quinn
Michael J. Fox as Clayton Farnsworth
Mark Margolis as New York Money
Treat Williams as Champ's Manager
Amy Wright as Loose Woman

Reception
Leonard Maltin awarded the film two and a half stars.

References

External links
 
 
 

American drama films
Films set in Vermont
Films based on American novels
1993 drama films
1993 films
1990s English-language films
1990s American films